The JCB Classic was a professional golf tournament held near Sendai in Miyagi Prefecture, Japan. It was founded in 1972 as the Tohoku Classic, and was an event on the Japan Golf Tour from 1973 until 2007.

The Tohoku Classic was held at Nishisendai Country Club until 1987. In 1988 it moved to Omotezao Kokusai Golf Club and was renamed the Sendai Classic; sponsored as the JCB Classic Sendai from 1990. The final event, in 2007, was held at Hananomori Golf Club as the JCB Classic and the prize fund was ¥100,000,000 with ¥20,000,000 going to the winner.

Tournament hosts

Winners

Notes

References

External links
JCB Classic official site
Coverage on the Japan Golf Tour's official site

Former Japan Golf Tour events
Defunct golf tournaments in Japan
Sport in Miyagi Prefecture
Recurring sporting events established in 1972
Recurring sporting events disestablished in 2007